Dilia Elena Díaz Cisneros (June 1, 1925 – July 10, 2017) was a Venezuelan teacher and poet born in El Hatillo, Miranda and married Victor Guillermo Ramos Rangel in 1947. She was the founder of the public schools "Bogotá", "Los Jardines" and "Caracciolo Parra León" in Caracas. Díaz Cisneros died of natural causes at the age of 92 in Caracas.

See also 
Education in Venezuela

References 
Review by Cecilia de Nuñez for the promotion Dilia Díaz de Ramos of the Pestalozzi Center, 1978.
Elogio de Dilia Díaz Cisneros - Lo afirmativo venezolano

1925 births
2017 deaths
Venezuelan schoolteachers
Venezuelan women poets
People from Miranda (state)
20th-century Venezuelan women writers
20th-century Venezuelan writers
21st-century Venezuelan women writers
21st-century Venezuelan writers
20th-century Venezuelan educators
Death in Caracas